Kaiir Elam (born May 5, 2001) is an American football cornerback for the Buffalo Bills of the National Football League (NFL). He played college football at Florida and was drafted by the Bills in the first round of the 2022 NFL Draft.

Early life and high school
Elam grew up in Riviera Beach, Florida, and attended The Benjamin School, where he played basketball, football, and ran track. As a senior, he recorded 71 tackles, three sacks and nine interceptions and was named the Palm Beach 5A-1A football defensive player of the year. Elam was rated the fourth best high school football prospect of his class by ESPN and committed to play college football at Florida.

College career
As a true freshman Elam played in all 13 of the Gators' games and made five starts, recording 11 tackles, three interceptions and four additional passes broken up and was named to the Southeastern Conference (SEC) All-Freshman Team. Elam entered his sophomore season on the Jim Thorpe Award watchlist and was named preseason second-team All-SEC. On January 10, 2022, Elam declared for the 2022 NFL Draft.

Professional career

The Buffalo Bills drafted Elam in the first round with the 23rd pick in the draft, trading up from 25th overall with the Baltimore Ravens to make the selection. Elam marks the fourth straight defensive player the Bills have selected with a first round pick, following Gregory Rousseau in 2021. He made his NFL debut in Week 1 against the Los Angeles Rams. He recorded his first professional interception off Kenny Pickett in Week 5 against the Pittsburgh Steelers in the 38-3 win. He finished his rookie season with 41 total tackles, two interceptions, and four passes defensed in 13 games.

Personal life
Elam's father, Abram Elam, played college football at Kent State and in the NFL for seven seasons. His uncle, Matt Elam, also played football at Florida and was a first round selection in the 2013 NFL Draft. Matt Elam currently plays for the Orlando Guardians of the XFL.

References

External links

 Buffalo Bills bio
Florida Gators bio

Living people
Players of American football from Florida
Sportspeople from the Miami metropolitan area
American football cornerbacks
Florida Gators football players
People from Riviera Beach, Florida
African-American players of American football
2001 births
21st-century African-American sportspeople
Buffalo Bills players